Nerea Pena Abaurrea (born 13 December 1989) is a Spanish handball player for Vipers Kristiansand and the Spanish national team.

She participated at the 2010 European Women's Handball Championship, where Spain placed 11th, and Penea was voted into the All-Star Team.

She participated at the 2011 World Women's Handball Championship in Brazil, where Spain placed third.

Achievements
EHF Champions League:
Winner: 2021/2022
Norwegian League:
Winner: 2021/2022
Norwegian Cup:
Winner: 2021, 2022/23

Individual awards  
All-Star Right Back of the European Championship: 2010
Nemzeti Bajnokság I Top Scorer: 2014/15 season
MVP of the Baia Mare Champions Trophy: 2014

References

External links

1989 births
Living people
Sportspeople from Pamplona
Spanish female handball players
Expatriate handball players
Spanish expatriate sportspeople in Denmark
Spanish expatriate sportspeople in Hungary
Ferencvárosi TC players (women's handball)
Siófok KC players
Handball players at the 2016 Summer Olympics
Olympic handball players of Spain
Handball players from Navarre
Handball players at the 2020 Summer Olympics